German submarine U-217 was a Type VIID mine-laying U-boat of Nazi Germany's Kriegsmarine during World War II.

Design
As one of the six German Type VIID submarines, U-217 had a displacement of  when at the surface and  while submerged. She had two shafts and two  propellers.

U-217 was fitted with five  torpedo tubes (four fitted at the bow and one at the stern), twelve torpedoes, one  SK C/35 naval gun, 220 rounds, and an anti-aircraft gun, in addition to five mine tubes with fifteen SMA mines. The boat had a complement of between forty-four.

Service history
She was laid down on 30 January 1941, launched on 15 November and commissioned on 31 January 1942, U-217 served with the 5th U-boat Flotilla in a training capacity before moving on to the operational 9th flotilla on 1 August 1942 until she was sunk. U-217 completed three patrols and sank three ships totalling .

She was sunk on 5 June 1943 in the mid-Atlantic with all hands by depth charges dropped by Grumman TBF Avengers from the escort carrier .

Wolfpacks
U-217 took part in two wolfpacks, namely:
 Pirat (30 July – 3 August 1942) 
 Trutz (1 – 5 June 1943)

Summary of raiding history

References

Bibliography

External links

1941 ships
German Type VIID submarines
Ships built in Kiel
U-boats sunk by US aircraft
U-boats sunk by depth charges
U-boats commissioned in 1942
U-boats sunk in 1943
World War II shipwrecks in the Atlantic Ocean
World War II submarines of Germany
Ships lost with all hands
Maritime incidents in June 1943